Amedia AS is the second largest media company in Norway (the largest is Schibsted and the third largest is Polaris Media). The company is whole or partial owner of 50 local and regional newspaper with online newspapers and printing presses, and its own news agency, Avisenes Nyhetsbyrå. The corporation also owns and operates a group of printing plants under the brand name Prime Print in Russia.

History
Amedia AS was established on 27 May 1948 as Norsk Arbeiderpresse (lit: Norwegian Labour Press). It was an association of social democratic newspapers. It was renamed A-pressen in 1994, a name which it retained until 2012.

The company was originally created to finance Norwegian labour newspapers owned by the labour unions and Labour Party. In 1990 the company was refinanced and transferred to a corporation, with the Norwegian Confederation of Trade Unions and the Labour Party as the largest owners. When A-pressen bought part of TV2, the Labour Party chose to sell their stake in the company, and instead the MøllerGruppen, the Finnish company Sanoma and Telenor bought part of the company and it was listed on the Oslo Stock Exchange. In the end Sanoma sold their stake, the company was delisted and was then owned by the Norwegian Confederation of Trade Unions (45,2%), Telenor (44,8%) and the Fritt Ord Foundation (10,1%).

The company sold its 50% stake in TV2 in January 2012.

Amedia bought competitor Edda Media from Mecom Group in 2012.

Amedia was bought by Sparebankstiftelsen DnB in 2016 and the company is now owned by Amediastiftelsen (The Amedia Foundation).

In April 2022, Amedia announced it was handing over its four printing houses in Russia worth some 4 million Euro to the editor-in-chief of the newspaper Novaya Gazeta, Dmitry Muratov, as it was ceasing its business activities in Russia.

CEOs
Johan Ona (1948–1974)
Einar Olsen (1974–1987)
Alf Hildrum (1987–2007)
Even Nordstrøm (2007–2010)
Thor Gjermund Eriksen (2010–2013)
Are Stokstad (2013–2020)
Anders Møller Opdahl (2020–present)

Chairmen of the board
Konrad Nordahl (1948–1965) 
Tor Aspengren (1965–1981) 
Tor Halvorsen (1981?–1987)
Leif Haraldseth (1987–1990, acting from 1987 to 1988)
Svein-Erik Oxholm (1990–1997)
Jan Balstad (1997–2002)
Roar Flåthen (2002–2005)
Gerd-Liv Valla (2005–2007) 
Erik Nord (2007–2010)
Jon Hippe (2010-2011)
Roar Flåthen (2011–present)

Newspapers

 Agder Flekkefjords Tidende
 Akershus Amtstidende
 Arbeidets Rett
 Aura Avis
 Aust Agder Blad
 Avisa Nordland
 Avisa Oslo
 Bergensavisen
 Bodø by
 Bodø nu
 Budstikka
 Bygdeposten
 Dalane Tidende
 Demokraten
 Drammens Tidende
 Eiker Bladet
 Enebakk Avis
 Finnmarken
 Finnmark Dagblad
 Finnmarksposten
 Firda
 Firdaposten
 Fredriksstad blad
 Fremover
 Gjengangeren
 Gjesdalbuen
 Glåmdalen
 Hadeland
 Halden Arbeiderblad
 Halden Dagblad
 Hamar Arbeiderblad
 Hardanger Folkeblad
 Haugesunds Avis
 Helgeland Arbeiderblad
 Indre Akershus Blad
 Jarlsberg
 Kvinnheringen
 Lofotposten
 Lofot-Tidende
 Malvik Bladet
 Min Áigi
 Moss Dagblad
 Namdalsavisa
 Nettavisen
 Nordlys
 Opdalingen
 Oppland Arbeiderblad
 Porsgrunns Dagblad
 Rakkestad Avis
 Rana Blad
 Ringerikes Blad
 Rjukan Arbeiderblad
 Rogalands Avis
 Romerikes Blad
 Sarpsborg Arbeiderblad
 Smaalenenes Avis
 Stjørdalens Blad
 Telemarksavisa
 Tidens Krav
 Tvedestrandsposten
 Østlands-Posten
 Øyene

References

 
1948 establishments in Norway
Mass media companies established in 1948
Mass media companies of Norway
Holding companies of Norway
Companies formerly listed on the Oslo Stock Exchange
Companies based in Oslo
Norwegian Confederation of Trade Unions
Telenor
Mass media in Oslo